Secret Lives is a 1937 British war drama film directed by Edmond T. Gréville and starring Brigitte Horney, Neil Hamilton and Raymond Lovell. It was made at Ealing Studios by the independent Phoenix Films. The screenplay concerns a young woman who is recruited into the French secret service.

The film is also known by the alternative title of I Married a Spy.

Plot
At the outbreak of the First World War a young German-born woman living in Paris is interned and then recruited into the French secret service for operations against Germany.

Cast
 Brigitte Horney as Lena Schmidt  
 Neil Hamilton as Lt. Pierre de Montmalion  
 Raymond Lovell as German Secret Service Chief  
 Charles Carson as Henri  
 Ivor Barnard as Baldhead  
 Frederick Lloyd as French Secret Service Chief  
 Leslie Perrins as J 14  
 Gyles Isham as Franz Abel  
 Hay Petrie as Robert Pigeon  
 Ben Field as Karl Schmidt 
 Ralph Truman as Prison Guard

References

Bibliography
 Low, Rachael. Filmmaking in 1930s Britain. George Allen & Unwin, 1985.
 Wood, Linda. British Films, 1927-1939. British Film Institute, 1986.

External links

1937 films
1930s war drama films
1930s spy drama films
British spy drama films
British war drama films
Ealing Studios films
Films directed by Edmond T. Gréville
Films set in France
Films set in Spain
Films set in Switzerland
World War I spy films
British black-and-white films
1937 drama films
Films scored by Walter Goehr
1930s English-language films
1930s British films